The Latvia Open is the biggest World Darts Federation ranked darts tournament in Latvia and the Baltic States. It has been a  WDF world ranked competition since 2004.

List of tournaments

Men's

Women's

Youth's

Boys

Girls

References

External links
 Latvia Darts Organization
 Latvia Open 2010
 Latvia Open 2009 video
 Latvia Open 2008 results

Darts tournaments
Sport in Latvia
2004 establishments in Latvia
Recurring sporting events established in 2004